The following is an incomplete list of annual festivals in the province of Alberta, Canada.  This list includes festivals of diverse types, including regional festivals, commerce festivals, fairs, food festivals, arts festivals, religious festivals, folk festivals, and recurring festivals on holidays.

Sublists

By city
List of festivals in Calgary
List of festivals in Edmonton
List of festivals in Lethbridge

By type
List of music festivals in Canada#Alberta

Festivals

Calgary Region

Edmonton Region

Rockies

Central Alberta

Northern Alberta

Southern Alberta

See also

List of festivals in Canada
Culture of Alberta
Tourism in Alberta

References

External links

Travel Alberta - events and festivals
 Events along the Cowboy Trail
http://www.albertaviews.ab.ca/issues/2000/mayjun00/index.html

Festivals
Alberta
Alberta